Arena Capivari is a stadium in Capivari, São Paulo, Brazil, and home of Capivariano Futebol Clube.

References

Football venues in São Paulo (state)